Devon Rodriguez (born 1996) is an American artist and painter from the South Bronx, New York City. He initially gained recognition for painting a series of realistic portraits, on the New York City Subway system. In 2019, he was a finalist in the Outwin Boochever Portrait Competition for his portrait of sculptor, John Ahearn. In 2020, he joined the platform TikTok and gained immediate success for sketching strangers and capturing their reactions. He is now the most followed visual artist on the platform.

Early life and education

Devon Rodriguez was born in 1996 in the South Bronx. At age 8, he began doing graffiti with his friends but, after being arrested at age 13, he turned his attention to portraits. In 2010, he applied for the High School of Art and Design in Manhattan, but wasn't accepted. He then attended Samuel Gompers High School in the Bronx for two years before being accepted to attend the High School of Art and Design in 2012. He graduated from that school in 2014. He later attended the Fashion Institute of Technology.

Career

While Rodriguez was still in high school, sculptor John Ahearn attended a school portrait exhibit and took notice of Rodriguez's realist oil paintings of subway passengers. Ahearn then asked Rodriguez to be a subject for his own sculpted portrait. The resultant work, two plaster busts of Rodriguez called The Rodriguez Twins, was a finalist for the Outwin Boochever Portrait Competition and was displayed at the National Portrait Gallery in Washington, D.C. in 2016. Rodriguez attended the opening gala at the Gallery in place of Ahearn.
 
In 2015, Rodriguez's own pieces were featured in an issue of Southwest Art. His work, including some of his paintings of subway passengers, would go on to be featured in publications like The New Yorker, The Artist's Magazine, and The New York Times Style Magazine in the following years. Rodriguez also began taking commissions. In 2019, it was announced that Rodriguez's portrait of John Ahearn was a finalist for the Outwin Boochever Portrait Competition, three years after Ahearn's own portrait of Rodriguez received the honor. The prize eventually went to Hugo Crosthwaite.

References

External links

1996 births
Living people
American male painters
American portrait painters
21st-century American painters
Artists from the Bronx
Fashion Institute of Technology alumni
American realist painters
High School of Art and Design alumni
21st-century American male artists
Painters from New York City